The Kreisliga Pfalz (English: District league Palatinate) was the highest association football league in the Bavarian region of Palatinate from 1919 to 1923. The league was disbanded with the introduction of the Bezirksliga Rhein in 1923.

Overview

Predecessor
From 1907, four regional leagues were formed within the structure of the Southern German football championship, in a move to improve the organisation of football in Southern Germany, these being:
 Ostkreis-Liga, covering Bavaria
 Nordkreis-Liga, covering Hesse
 Südkreis-Liga, covering Württemberg, Baden and Alsace
 Westkreis-Liga, covering the Palatinate, Lorraine and the southern Rhine Province

In 1908, a first Westkreis-Liga (English: Western District League) was established. With the outbreak of the First World War, league football came to a halt and, during the war, games were only played on a limited level.

Post-First World War
With the collapse of the German Empire in 1918, no Westkreis championship was played in 1918-19 but football returned to a more organised system in 1919.

Southern Germany, now without the Alsace and Lorraine regions, the later having been part of the Westkreis and had to be returned to France, was sub-divided into ten Kreisligas, these being:
 Kreisliga Hessen      
 Kreisliga Nordbayern  
 Kreisliga Nordmain    
 Kreisliga Odenwald    
 Kreisliga Pfalz       
 Kreisliga Saar        
 Kreisliga Südbayern  
 Kreisliga Südmain     
 Kreisliga Südwest     
 Kreisliga Württemberg

The new Kreisliga Pfalz was made up from eight clubs from the Westkreis region. The league winners of the Kreisligas advanced to the Southern championship. This system applied for the 1919-20 and 1920-21 season, with the league expanding to ten clubs for the later.

In 1921-22, the Kreisliga Pfalz was split into two groups of eight, increasing the number of tier-one clubs in the region to 16. The two league winners then played a final to determine the Pfalz champion, which in turn advanced to a Rhein championship final against the Odenwald champion. This "watering down" of football in the region lasted for only one season, in 1922-23, the number of top clubs was reduced to eight clubs in a single division, with a Rhein final against the Odenwald champion once more.

In 1923, a league reform which was decided upon in Darmstadt, Hesse, established the Southern German Bezirksligas which were to replace the Kreisligas. The best four teams each from the Kreisliga Odenwald and Pfalz were admitted to the new Bezirksliga Rhein. The four clubs from Pfalz were:
 Phönix Ludwigshafen
 Pfalz Ludwigshafen
 FG 03 Ludwigshafen
 FK Pirmasens

National success
No club from the Kreisliga Pfalz managed to qualify for the German championship but in three out of four years, the Pfalz champion reached the final of the Southern German championship to lose to the Bavarian representative.

Rhein championship
Played in 1922 and 1923, these were the finals:
 1922:
 Pfalz final: Phönix Ludwigshafen - FG 03 Ludwigshafen 1-0 / 2-4 / 3-2
 Rhein final: VfR Mannheim - Phönix Ludwigshafen 0-0 / 3-2
 1923:
 Rhein: Phönix Ludwigshafen - Phönix Mannheim 4-1 / 3-1

Southern German championship
Qualified teams and their success:
 1920:
 Pfalz Ludwigshafen, Runners-up
 1921:
 Phönix Ludwigshafen, Runners-up
 1922:
 Phönix Ludwigshafen, not qualified
 1923:
 Phönix Ludwigshafen, Runners-up

Winners and runners-up of the Kreisliga Pfalz

Placings in the Kreisliga Pfalz 1919-23

References

Sources
 Fussball-Jahrbuch Deutschland  (8 vol.), Tables and results of the German tier-one leagues 1919-33, publisher: DSFS
 Kicker Almanach,  The yearbook on German football from Bundesliga to Oberliga, since 1937, published by the Kicker Sports Magazine
 Süddeutschlands Fussballgeschichte in Tabellenform 1897-1988  History of Southern German football in tables, publisher & author: Ludolf Hyll

External links
 The Gauligas  Das Deutsche Fussball Archiv 
 German league tables 1892-1933  Hirschi's Fussball seiten
 Germany - Championships 1902-1945 at RSSSF.com

1
1919 establishments in Germany
1923 disestablishments in Germany
Football competitions in Rhineland-Palatinate
20th century in Rhineland-Palatinate
Southern German football championship
Sports leagues established in 1919
Ger